Ricardo Castro (1933 – November 14, 2003), better known as Carding Castro or Carding Cruz, was a Filipino actor, comedian and entertainer.

As an entertainer, Castro was part of the singing comic duo Reycard Duet, along with Rey Ramirez. The duo was established in 1954 and performed for over 40 years until 1997, when Ramirez died. After the latter's death, Castro remained active as a solo performer and for a few years was part of the ensemble cast of the ABS-CBN comedy sitcom Home Along Da Riles. He also did a few films with the late comedians Redford White and Babalu.

In 1961, Castro was credited with popularizing the "Dodonpa" dance in Japan. He stated that he was inspired by the songs "Manhattan" and "How High the Moon" by Joe Loco in creating the dance.

Castro died of cardiac arrest in Las Vegas on November 14, 2003.

Filmography

Movies
Tar-San (1999) as San (Final film appearance)
Isprikitik: Walastik Kung Pumitik (1999) ... Marlon
Tik Tak Toys: My Kolokotoys (1999) ... Elvis
Katabi Ko'y Mamaw (1990) (as ReyCard Duet)
Yes, Yes, Yo Kabayong Kutsero (1989) (as ReyCard Duet)
Ibalik ang Swerti (1981) (as Reycard Duet)
The Young Idols (1972) (as ReyCard Duet)
Everybody, Dance (1964) (as ReyCard Duet)
Let's Go (1964) (as ReyCard Duet)

Television
Home Along Da Riles (ABS-CBN, 1998–2000) ... Elvis
Magandang Tanghali Bayan (ABS-CBN, 1998–1999)
Kaya ni Mister, Kaya ni Misis (ABS-CBN, 1997–2001) ... as Mario

References

External links

1935 births
2003 deaths
20th-century comedians
Filipino male comedians
Filipino male film actors
Filipino male television actors
Filipino television personalities